Seoán Ó Leaáin, Bishop of Clonfert, 1322–1336. Ó Leaáin appears to have been a member of the same family as
Mauricius Ó Leaáin (Bishop of Kilmacduagh 1254–1284), Nicol Ó Leaáin, (ditto, 1358–1393) and Gregorius Ó Leaáin (1394–1397).

Previously Archdeacon of Tuam. He was elected 10 November 1319, but wasn't appointed until 6 August 1322. Ó Leaáin was consecrated 20 September and received possession of temporalities 29 December 1322. After his death on 7 April 1336, the see lay vacant for as many as ten years. However, at some point prior to 14 October 1437, he was succeeded by a prince of the Ui Maine dynasty, Tomás mac Gilbert Ó Cellaigh.

See also

 Noel Lane (born 1954), retired Galway Gaelic Athletic Association (GAA) manager
 Sylvie Linnane (born 1956) retired GAA sportsman

References

External links
 http://www.ucc.ie/celt/published/T100005C/
 https://archive.org/stream/fastiecclesiaehi04cottuoft#page/n17/mode/2up
 http://www.irishtimes.com/ancestor/surname/index.cfm?fuseaction=Go.&UserID=

Archdeacons of Tuam
14th-century Roman Catholic bishops in Ireland
People from County Galway
Bishops of Clonfert